Yehoshua Rozin (‎; 16 August 1918 – 6 February 2002) was an Israeli basketball coach.

Biography
Rozin was born in Alexandria, Egypt.  He moved to Israel at the age of six. He played basketball for Maccabi Tel Aviv in the 1930s and 1940s, beginning at the age of 14.

In 1948, he became the first coach of the Israel national basketball team. He led it to three European Tournament finals. Rozin was the first coach of the Maccabi Tel Aviv basketball team and coached it for 18 years, starting in 1953. During his career he also coached Hapoel Givat-Yagur, Hapoel Holon, Hapoel Givat Brenner, Elitzur Tel Aviv, Hapoel Haifa, Hapoel Jerusalem, Maccabi Ramat Gan, and Hapoel Tel Aviv.

In 1999, Rozin was awarded the Israel Prize for his contribution to sport. He died in 2002, at the age of 83.

He was married to Yafa Katzurin (1923-2007).

Hall of Fame
He was Jewish, and in 1992 he was inducted into the Jewish Sports Hall of Fame.

See also
List of Israel Prize recipients

References

1918 births
2002 deaths
Israeli men's basketball players
Egyptian men's basketball players
Jewish men's basketball players
Maccabi Tel Aviv B.C. players
Maccabi Tel Aviv B.C. coaches
Israel Prize in sport recipients
Sportspeople from Alexandria
Egyptian basketball coaches
Israeli basketball coaches
Hapoel Jerusalem B.C.
Hapoel Tel Aviv B.C. coaches
Israeli Jews
Israeli people of Polish-Jewish descent
Egyptian Jews
Egyptian emigrants to Israel
Egyptian people of Polish-Jewish descent
Sportspeople from Tel Aviv
People from Tel Aviv